Conchagua is a municipality in the La Unión department of El Salvador. It contains the Conchagua volcano. The proposed Airport of the Pacific will be built in the municipality.

References 

Municipalities of the La Unión Department